The Institute for Telecommunication Sciences (ITS) performs the research and engineering that enables the U.S. Government, national and international standards organizations, and many aspects of private industry to manage the radio spectrum and ensure that innovative, new technologies are recognized and effective.

Past experience, current knowledge, and facilities allow the institute  to solve complex telecommunications problems, as well as visually postulate the significant needs for the future. ITS is notable for  pioneering work on radio wave propagation, development of measurement methods to characterize complex signals, and predict end-to-end system performance. This government entity also provides research and engineering that is critical to continued U.S. leadership in telecommunications technology.

(Dept. of Commerce)

Overview
The Institute for Telecommunication Sciences (ITS) is the research and engineering laboratory of the National Telecommunications and Information Administration (NTIA), and a part of the U.S. Department of Commerce (DOC).  ITS supports such NTIA telecommunications objectives as promotion of advanced telecommunications and information infrastructure development in the United States, enhancement of domestic competitiveness, improvement of foreign trade opportunities for U.S. telecommunications firms, and facilitation of more efficient and effective use of the radio spectrum.

ITS also serves as a principal Federal resource for solving the telecommunications concerns of other Federal agencies, state and local governments, private corporations and associations, and international organizations. These problems fall into the areas of communications technology use (including RF, PSTN and IP/IT).

ITS works with government (U.S. government) agencies and private organizations to explore, understand, and improve the use of telecommunications technologies and principles; investigate and invent new technologies and overcome telecommunications challenges. Research and expertise are employed not only for contributions to standards creation, but also to analyze new and emerging technologies, as well as improve telecommunications trade opportunities.

Federal Technology Transfer Act
Cooperative research agreements based upon the Federal Technology Transfer Act of 1986 are the principal means of aiding the private sector. This Act provides the legal basis for and encourages shared use of Government facilities and resources with the private sector in advanced telecommunications technologies. These partnerships aid in the commercialization of new products and services.

The movement of technology from the federal laboratories to industry and to state and local
governments is achieved through technology transfer. Technology transfer is a process by which
technology developed in one organization, in one area, or for one purpose is applied in another
organization, in another area, or for another purpose.

Program areas
As of 2009 the institute's technical activities are organized into four program areas. These are: Spectrum and Propagation Measurements • Telecommunications and Information Technology  Planning • Telecommunications Engineering, Analysis, and Modeling • and finally Telecommunications theory.

Facilities
The institute's facilities and capabilities include the following:
• Audio-Visual Laboratories
• Public Safety RF Laboratory
• Public Safety Audio and Video Laboratories
• Radio Spectrum Measurement Science (RSMS)
Program
• Secure Internet (SIPRNET)
• Table Mountain Field Site/Radio Quiet Zone
• Telecommunications Analysis Services

Staff
ITS’ staff of Federal employees have strong engineering and scientific skills and experience. The majority of employees are electronics engineers; the rest are mathematicians, physicists, computer scientists, and administrative staff.

Sponsors
ITS also describes itself as a valuable resource, which supports many Federal agencies and industry organization.

Government
The DOC and other Federal agencies sponsor the activities and programs of the institute.  Agency sponsors that provide significant support include the National Institute of Standards and Technology's Office of Law Enforcement Standards, the Department of Homeland Security, the Department of Transportation, the Department of Defense, the National Archives, and the National Weather Service.

Industry
ITS supports private sector telecommunications research through cooperative research and development agreements (CRADAs) based on the Federal Technology Transfer Act of 1986. The Act encourages sharing of Government facilities and expertise as an aid in the commercialization of new products and services. ITS is a member of the Federal Laboratory Consortium for Technology Transfer (FLC), formally chartered by the Federal Technology Transfer Act in 1986. CRADAs with other research organizations, telecommunications service providers, and equipment
manufacturers support technology transfer and commercialization of telecommunications products and services, which are major goals of the DOC. ITS has had CRADAs with large companies as well as with small start-ups. Partnerships such as these enhance synergies between entrepreneurial ventures and broad national goals.

History
The Institute began in the 1940s as the Interservice Radio Propagation Laboratory, which later became the Central Radio Propagation Laboratory (CRPL) of the National Bureau of Standards in the U.S. Department of Commerce. A new facility was built for CRPL in Boulder, Colorado, and dedicated by President Eisenhower in September 1954.

In 1965, CRPL became part of the Environmental Science Services Administration (ESSA). At that time, CRPL was renamed the Institute for Telecommunication Sciences and Aeronomy (ITSA). In 1967, ITSA split into four labs within ESSA: the Aeronomy Laboratory, the Space Disturbances Laboratory, the Wave Propagation Laboratory, and the Institute for Telecommunication Sciences (ITS).

In 1970, Executive Order 11556 established the Office of Telecommunications (OT) within the Department of Commerce and the Office of Telecommunications Policy (OTP) in the Executive Office of the President. At the same time, ITS was transferred into OT.

Finally, under the President's Reorganization Act #1 of 1977, OT and the Office of Telecommunications Policy merged to form the National Telecommunications and Information Administration (NTIA). Since that time, ITS has performed telecommunications research and provided technical engineering support to NTIA and to other Federal agencies on a reimbursable basis.

Over the past decade, ITS has expanded its historical role by conducting cooperative research and development with U.S. industry and academia under the provisions of the Federal Technology Transfer Act of 1986.

Critique of Domestic technology transfer

References

External links
 ITS Home page

United States communications regulation
United States Department of Commerce